Smithfield is a suburb of Sydney, in the state of New South Wales, Australia. Located in the Greater Western Sydney region, the suburb is one of the largest in Fairfield City by area.

Established in 1836, Smithfield was the first major settlement of the Fairfield LGA. The original 1838 summary plan of Smithfield shows the suburb laid out in a grid pattern with most of the streets having the same names as they do today. Geologically, the suburb sits on the Cumberland Plain. The suburb is a mix of residential, industrial and commercial areas, but is mostly characterized by low-density housing.

Located partially in the suburb, the Smithfield-Wetherill Park Industrial Estate is the largest industrial estate in the southern hemisphere and is the centre of manufacturing and distribution in greater western Sydney. Smithfield West is a locality within the suburb and it is an unofficial designation for the region westwards from Dublin Street to the boundary of Wetherill Park.

History
Aboriginal people from the Cabrogal tribe, a sub-group of the Gandangara tribe, have lived in the Fairfield area for over 30,000 years.

White settlement began in the area in the early 19th century. Smithfield was originally known as Chilsholm's Bush. In 1803, homeless children were becoming a problem after convicts turned their children out into the streets. By 1836, some of this land was offered for sale by the colonial government of the time. John Ryan Brenan (1798–1868), an attorney who was appointed Police Magistrate in 1836, bought  here. Early settlers were attracted to Smithfield by its good soil, dependable water supply and easy access to the Colony's established towns. Some of the best farming land was in the district to the west and southwest of the Smithfield area. In 1867, Smithfield was a semi-rural settlement populated by vine growers, gardeners, wood timber cutters, orchards and tanneries.

Brenan planned to make money with a meat market and a cattle sale yard. He subdivided the estate and named it Smithfield after the meat markets of London and Dublin. Saleyards opened in 1841 but the project to establish a village around the yards failed.  Despite this, Smithfield did become a thriving commercial centre and remains a significant employment centre in south-western Sydney as part of the Wetherill Park/Yennora industrial block.

Smithfield still has the street patterns Brenan planned and the street names he chose. In the subdivision, Brenan offered an extra adjoining allotment to any buyer who built a cottage with a brick chimney and enclosed the property with a fence. The public school opened in 1850 and by the 1880s Smithfield was well provided with churches, many of which still remain today as important relics of Smithfield's rich local heritage.

From 2011 onwards, Smithfield has been the shooting for exterior scenes of Sunnyvale, the fictional suburb in the controversial Australian comedy television series Housos.

Transport
The Horsley Drive is the major road that runs through Smithfield. Other major roads include Polding Street, Brennan Street and Victoria Street, with the latter featuring factories.

Bus services are provided by Transit Systems Sydney. The closest train station is Fairfield train station, on the Inner West & Leppington Line and Cumberland Line. Transit Systems Sydney buses 806, 808, 812, 813, 814 and 817, which go through the suburb, link to that station, with 806 also linking to Parramatta railway station and Liverpool railway station.

There is a cycle way called Prospect Creek Cyclepath that runs through the suburb, which is part of the Western Sydney Regional Park recreational route.

Commercial area
The commercial area is centred on The Horsley Drive, which is the main street in Smithfield, the most significant east-west road in the region that runs from Carramar and Wetherill Park. The roadway is ornamented by several curtain figs. The suburb's mains street features health services, a gymnasium, beauty & specialty shops, commercial services, multicultural restaurants such as Italian, Middle Eastern and Chinese among others. There was also a Coles supermarket, before it closed in late 2022.  A prominent pub on The Horsley Drive and Cumberland Highway called the Smithfield Tavern features a restaurant, a TAB, adult entertainment sessions and concert parties. 

There is a large industrial area in Smithfield with a number of factories and warehouses. The industrial estate in suburb is the largest in the southern hemisphere and is one of the primary centres for manufacturing and distribution in Greater Western Sydney.

Culture
Smithfield features an art gallery, museum and an RSL club. Smithfield was the location for the 7mate show Housos, being one of the many locations for that TV show. Smithfield Cemetery, established in the 19th century, is situated in the western parts of the suburb, and is currently managed by the Syriac Orthodox Church.

Places of worship
Smithfield Baptist Church is on the corner of The Horsley Drive and O’Connel Street
St James Anglican church is on the corner of The Horsley Drive and Justin Street 
St Benedicts Catholic Church is located in Justin Street  
Smithfield Uniting Church is on The Horsley Drive   
Minh Giac Temple, a Vietnamese Buddhist temple on the Horsley Drive
St Mary's Church, an Assyrian church is located in Polding Street
Smithfield Mosque known as the Australian Bosnian Islamic Society Gazi Husrev-beg, established by Bosnian immigrants in the late 1980s, is located in Bourke Street.

Recreational areas
Brenan Park is a large recreational area, and one of the most prominent in Fairfield City, which features sports grounds, children's playgrounds and picnic areas.

Rosford Street Reserve is a parkland in the northern skirts of the suburb which features a large sports grounds and an urban forest. It adjoins Long Street Park, which is situated in Cumberland Council section of Smithfield.

Adjacent to the cemetery is a small, endangered plant community of the Cumberland Plain Woodland, which is a component of the Cooks River/Castlereagh Ironbark ecological community, that features Eucalyptus fibrosa and Eucalyptus moluccana as the dominant canopy species.

Climate
Smithfield has a humid subtropical climate (Köppen climate classification: Cfa) with warm to hot summers and cool, though at times mild, winters with sporadic rainfall throughout the year. It is usually a few degrees warmer than Sydney on summer days and a few degrees cooler on winter nights. There could be a temperature differential of 5 degrees Celsius in summer due to sea breezes in the City that don't generally penetrate inland, and in extreme cases there could be a 10 degrees differential. It receives less annual rain than Sydney CBD by about 300mm. Late winter and early spring receive the least rainfall, whilst late summer and autumn receive more rain.

Education
There are local primary schools including Smithfield Public School and Smithfield West Public School. There are no local high schools, however, residents living in the western vicinity of Smithfield are in the area for Westfields Sports High School, and Fairfield High School for those living in the South Eastern outskirts of the suburb. There is a TAFE nearby in Wetherill Park.  High schools in surrounding suburbs include, Holroyd High School at Greystanes; Patrician Brothers College, Fairfield; Warakirri College, Fairfield; Merrylands High School, Merrylands; Cerdon College, Merrylands; Canley Vale High School, Canley Vale and Fairvale High School, Fairfield West.

Politics
Smithfield is governed at the local government level by Fairfield City Council, with Frank Carbone (Independent) as Mayor. At the state level, Hugh McDermott (Labor) is the state member for Prospect. At the federal level, Chris Bowen and Jason Clare (both Labor) are Federal MPs for the seats of McMahon and Blaxland respectively.

Smithfield was an electoral district of the Legislative Assembly in the Australian state of New South Wales from 1988 to 2015, where it was largely replaced by, and centred on, Prospect.

Demographics
According to the 2021 Australian Bureau of Statistics Census of Population, there were 13,160 persons usually resident in Smithfield. The median age of people in Smithfield was 38 years. Smithfield had an unemployment rate of 8.9%.

Ethnic diversity
The most common ancestries in Smithfield were Australian (12.7%), Assyrian (11.4%), English (10.0%), Vietnamese (9.2%) and Iraqi (9.0%). 31.2% of people only spoke English at home. Other languages spoken at home included Arabic (15.3%), Assyrian Neo-Aramaic (10.5%), Vietnamese (9.6%),
Chaldean Neo-Aramaic (5.7%) and Spanish (3.2%). Combining the Assyrian and Chaldean Aramaic varieties, Neo-Aramaic will be the most common language other than English, at 16.2%.

Country of birth 
Of the people in Smithfield, 42.4% of them were born in Australia. 13.7% of people had both parents born in Australia and 72.9% of people had both parents born overseas. The other common countries of birth were Iraq (18.1%), Vietnam (6.9%), Syria (4.8%), Italy (2.3%) and Lebanon (2.2%).

Religion
Almost three in four residents (68.4%) practice Christianity. The most common responses for religion were Catholic (38.4%), No Religion (10.6%), Islam (9.4%), Buddhism (8.0%) and Assyrian Apostolic (6.8%).

Housing
Separate housing dominates the area, comprising 77.3% of total occupied private dwellings, 10.7% were semi-detached, row or terrace houses, townhouses etc., 10.2% were flat or apartments and 1.5% were other dwellings. 27.3% of the dwellings were owned and 26.4% were owned with a mortgage, and 43.0% were rented. 7.1% had 1 bedroom, 15.2% had 2 bedrooms, 43.7% had 3 bedrooms and 32.0% had 4 or more bedrooms. The average number of bedrooms per occupied private dwelling was 3.1. 51.2% were couple families with children, 24.1% were couple families without children and 22.4% were one parent families, 15.9% of single parents were male and 84.8% were female.

Notable residents
Harry Kewell, socceroos footballer
Chris Bowen, politician

Gallery

References

Suburbs of Sydney
Populated places established in 1836
Cumberland Council, New South Wales
City of Fairfield
1836 establishments in Australia